This is the list of U.S. states that have participated in the Little League World Series since its inception in 1947. As of 2022, 43 states have qualified and participated in at least one world series. The United States holds a total of 37 Little League titles won by 14 different states. Among the states, California holds the record for most titles (7) and most U.S. titles (15), while Florida has appeared in a total of 23 world series' and 8 championship games but has not yet won a title.

State Participants
As of the 2022 Little League World Series

U.S. Finals

Since 1976, a U.S. final is played. The winner plays versus the International Champion for the LLWS championship. In 2021, no international teams participated in the tournament which meant there was no official U.S. final. The 2021 LLWS championship game is also considered the U.S. championship game.
As the 2022 Little League World Series

Regional Appearances
As of the 2022 LLWS, seven states, and the federal district of Washington D.C., have only ever appeared in regional tournaments and have never advanced to the LLWS. In 2022, Utah became the most recent state to qualify for their first world series after a tournament expansion took place.

Notes
 The Rolando Paulino LL of The Bronx was forced to forfeit all its wins in the 2001 Little League World Series due to the Danny Almonte controversy.
 Jackie Robinson West LL fielded ineligible players resulting in all their wins being forfeited including the U.S. Championship in the 2014 Little League World Series. Mountain Ridge LL of Las Vegas, Nevada is the official U.S. Champion and World Series Runner-Up. The game is recorded as a 6–0 loss (Non-forfeited score, 7–5 Illinois).
 Virginia shares 1976 3rd place with Puerto Rico. The game was canceled due to weather.
 Indiana shares 1986 3rd place with Dominican Republic. The game was canceled due to weather.
 Oregon shares 2006 3rd place with Mexico. The game was canceled due to weather.
 Montana shares 2011 3rd place with Mexico. The game was canceled due to Hurricane Irene.
 The 2020 Little League World Series was cancelled due to the COVID-19 pandemic
 The 2021 Little League World Series only featured United States teams for the first time since 1975. Two teams from each of the 8 U.S. regions participated in the World Series (regional champion and runner-up)

 The 2022 Little League World Series included the return of international teams and a tournament expansion which added four regions (Metro, Mountain, Panama, Puerto Rico)

References

appearances